A Little Messed Up is the third studio album by pop-punk band The Dollyrots.  It was released on August 17, 2010 on Blackheart Records.

Reception
The Allmusic review by Tim Sendra awarded the album 3.5 stars stating "The Dollyrots' third album takes the California trio one step further away from the punky sound of their 2004 debut record on Lookout and toward the mainstream... Many of the songs are uptempo and almost fiery, but on the whole, the record is more cuddly than dangerous. Basically, they've tipped the balance on the pop-punk scale completely to the pop side, and anyone looking for a record that has some bite or holds any surprises might want to look elsewhere. And if you were a fan of the earlier Dollyrots albums, you may be a bit disappointed by the direction they've taken. Having said that, A Little Messed Up isn't a bad record."

Writing for Pop Matters, critic Lana Cooper said "the Dollyrots continue their mission as purveyors of peppy pop punk." and gave the album a 7/10 rating.

Track listing

Personnel 
The following people worked on the album:

The Dollyrots
Kelly Ogden – bass, vocals
Luis Cabezas – guitar, vocals
Chris Black – drums
Other musicians
Kim Shattuck – guest vocals on "Some Girls"
Andy Cabezas – background vocals and percussion
Eddie Vasquez – background vocals and percussion
Chris Testa– background vocals and percussion
Fred Archambault – background vocals and percussion
Amy Wood – additional drums/percussion

Production
Chris Testa– producer, engineer, mixing
Matt Wallace – producer, engineer, mixing
Evan Frankfort – producer, engineer, mixing
Fred Archambault – producer, engineer, mixing 
Luis Cabezas – producer, engineer, mixing
Sylvia Massy – mixing, engineer
Jorge Valasco – assistant engineer and editing
Ken Sluiter – digital editing
Rich Veltrop – assistant engineer and editing
Steve Fallone – mastering
Will Kennedy – assistant engineer
Design
James Jaeger – photography
Carianne Brinkman – layout
Gabe Godin – layout

References

External links

2010 albums
The Dollyrots albums
Blackheart Records albums
Albums recorded at Sound City Studios